The Japan national under-20 futsal team for under 20 level represents Japan in international futsal competitions and is controlled by the Futsal Commission of the Japan Football Association.

Results and fixtures

Legend

2019

Fixtures & Results (U-20 futsal 2019), JFA.jp

2022

U-19 futsal 

 Fixtures & Results (U-19 futsal 2022), JFA.jp

2023
 Fixtures & Results (U-19 futsal 2023), JFA.jp

Coaching staff

Current coaching staff

Players

Current squad
The following players were called-up for the Futsal Week U-19 Summer Cup, held in June 2022.

See also

 Sport in Japan
 Futsal in Japan
 Japan Football Association (JFA)

 National teams
 Men's
 National futsal team
 Women's
 National futsal team

References

External links
  Japan national under-20 futsal team – official website

N
Futsal